"Wehikuł czasu", also known as "Wehikuł czasu / To był by cud" (from Polish: time machine / it would be a miracle), is a Polish-language song by blues rock band Dżem, written and performed by Ryszard Riedel and composed by Adam Otręba. It was published in 1989 on the Najemnik album.

Song also appeared on the albums: Wehikuł czasu – Spodek '92, Dżem w Operze cz. 1 i 2, Akustycznie oraz RMF FM - Najlepsza Muzyka Po Polsku 3.

Chart performance

Weekly charts

Yearly charts

Personnel 
 vocals: Ryszard Riedel
 lyrics: Ryszard Riedel
 composition: Adam Otręba
 producer: Marcin Jacobson

References 

1989 songs
1989 singles
Polish-language songs